Mevlüt Karakaya (born 1 January 1963) is a Turkish politician from the Nationalist Movement Party (MHP), who has served as a Member of Parliament for Adana since 7 June 2015.

Born in Adana, Karakaya graduated from Gazi University Faculty of Economics and Administrative Sciences. He became a professor at the age of 37, having continued as an academic in the United States at Indiana University, Michigan State University and Purdue University. He also briefly worked at the World Bank between 1997 and 1998. He has taught at Gazi University, Hacettepe University, İzmir University of Economics as well as Başkent University.

Having been active as a MHP member and serving as a member of the Party Executive Board for 10 years, he was appointed Deputy Leader of the MHP on 19 June 2011 with responsibilities for party finance. He was elected as a MHP Member of Parliament at the June 2015 general election.

See also
25th Parliament of Turkey

References

External links
 MHP biography
 Collection of all relevant news items at Haberler.com
 Collection of all relevant news items at Son Dakika

Nationalist Movement Party politicians
Deputies of Adana
Members of the 25th Parliament of Turkey
Living people
People from Adana
1963 births
Members of the 26th Parliament of Turkey